Kelvington was a provincial electoral district in Saskatchewan, Canada. It was created for the 1934 election, and was dissolved into Kelvington-Wadena in 1975.

Members of the Legislative Assembly

Former provincial electoral districts of Saskatchewan